Jörg Dürmüller (born 28 August 1959 in Bern) is a Swiss classical tenor in concert and opera.

Biography 
Dürmüller studied violin and voice at the conservatory of Winterthur and took voice master classes with Edith Mathis, Christa Ludwig and Hermann Prey.

As a concert singer, Dürmüller has appeared as the Evangelist in Bach's Passions and in his cantatas. He took part in the project of Ton Koopman to record the complete vocal works of Johann Sebastian Bach with the Amsterdam Baroque Orchestra & Choir. He is also a soloist in the ongoing project Dieterich Buxtehude – Opera Omnia of the same ensemble to record the complete works of Dieterich Buxtehude. He sang the tenor part of Haydn's The Creation at the Rheingau Musik Festival 2009 under Enoch zu Guttenberg.

On the opera stage he was engaged first in Bielefeld in 1987 for five years and at the Vienna Volksoper from 1997 where he appeared in Mozart operas, as Tamino in The Magic Flute, Ferrando in Così fan tutte and Ottavio in Don Giovanni, and as Don Ramiro in Rossini's La Cenerentola. As a freelance artist he has performed at the Komische Oper Berlin, among others.

Recordings
Recordings of Dürmüller have been released by Virgin Classics, Harmonia Mundi, Deutsche Grammophon, Orfeo International Music Munich, and Erato.

References 

 Opera Quarterly review of the recording with Jörg Dürmüller of Der Sprung über den Schatten by Ernst Krenek, accessed 25 January 2010
 New York Times review of Handel's Messiah with Jörg Dürmüller (December 18, 2008), accessed 25 January 2010

External links 
 Jörg Dürmüller on website of KulturKontor Regine Dierse
 Handel's Messiah Conducted by Ton Koopman at Avery Fisher Hall (December 2008), accessed 25 January 2010
 Entries for recordings by Jörg Dürmüller on WorldCat

1959 births
Living people
Swiss operatic tenors
People from Bern
20th-century Swiss male opera singers